Anamir is a sub-district located in Al Dhihar District, Ibb Governorate, Yemen. Anamir had a population of  11187 as of 2004.

References 

Sub-districts in Al Dhihar District